Miskin is a village approximately  south of Llantrisant in the county borough of Rhondda Cynon Taf, Wales.

The origin of the village was a small hamlet known as New Mill, which grew up around New Mill farm.  Miskin is part of the Pontyclun electoral ward.

History
The 1841 census records the settlement (originally a small hamlet by the name of New Inn) as having a population of 31. The opening of the Bute and Mwyndy iron ore mines in nearby Talbot Green, in 1852 and 1853 respectively, had a huge impact on the small hamlet of New Mill. The census of 1861 shows that New Mill had become a village, its population now 83 people in 17 households, and of these residents 17 were iron ore miners. By the early 1870s New Mill had become the village of Miskin, with the village centre being based around the inn, which is now The Miskin Arms pub.

The name change from New Mill to Miskin was brought about by Judge Gwilym Williams, and was taken from the medieval commote of Miskin. Williams, a staunch Welsh patriot, lived at Miskin Manor (built 1864), a Victorian L-plan mansion in a neo-Tudor style.

By the 1870s several ironstone mines are evident to the north of the village, and the village's population continued to grow, as skilled miners rather than heavy labourers were needed to extract the ore. The 1871 census records the village's population as 144, with more than half of the miners being immigrants from the depressed copper mining county of Cornwall.

Religion

A church has stood on the site of the current St David's church since 1878. Originally of corrugated iron construction, it was replaced by the current stone church in 1906–07. The land on which the church was built was owned by the Williams family.

Funds for the building of the church were raised by public donations and events, notably the Grand Fete at Miskin Manor which raised over £1,000, with the majority of the funds coming from Emma Eleanor Williams, Gwilym Williams' widow. The church was licensed on 23 December 1907 and consecrated by Right Rev Timothy Rees, Bishop of Llandaff, on Sunday 23 April 1933.

St David's Church was designed by local architect E. M. Bruce Vaughan and has been described as 'earnestly handsome'. The church has an over-buttressed square tower, and is faced with green Quarella stone outside and in. Of note are three stained glass windows by Jessie Bayes, to members of the Williams family.

There is also a large Roman Catholic church, All Hallows, on the outskirts of the village.

Miskin Mill
The Miskin Mill site has been the location of a water driven corn mill for most of the last 400 years.  Since 1929 it has been used by the Scouting movement for camping and training.

Transport
The nearest railway station is at Pontyclun.

References

External links 

www.geograph.co.uk: photos of Miskin and surrounding area

Villages in Rhondda Cynon Taf